Jānis Rinkus (born 12 April 1977) is a football midfielder from Latvia. His current club is FC Ditton.

References

1977 births
Living people
Sportspeople from Liepāja
Latvian footballers
Latvia international footballers
FK Liepājas Metalurgs players
FK Rīga players
Association football midfielders